Edinburgh East and Musselburgh may refer to:

 Edinburgh East and Musselburgh (Scottish Parliament constituency), a constituency of the Scottish Parliament, at Holyrood, 1999 to present
 Edinburgh East and Musselburgh (UK Parliament constituency), a constituency of the House of Commons of the Parliament of the United Kingdom, at Westminster, 1997 to 2005